List of Railway stations in Saudi Arabia:

SRO Dammam-Riyadh Line

SAR Cargo Line

SAR Riyadh-Qurayyat Line

SAR North South Railway Line

Haramain high-speed railway

Under Construction or Proposed 
 North South line
 Haditha – near Jordan border

 Al-Jawf – junction, south of Al-Jawf, station near the new motorway.

 Jubail

 Bosajata – junction

 Saudi Landbridge
 (Dark Blue on Map)
 Riyadh – national capital
 Jeddah Central (connected to port)

Defunct 

The Hejaz Railway was a narrow gauge railway ( track gauge) that ran from Damascus to Medina, through the Hejaz region of Saudi Arabia, with a branch line to Haifa on the Mediterranean Sea. It was a part of the Ottoman railway network. The line was and was planned to extend from the Haydarpaşa Terminal in Kadikoy beyond Damascus to the holy city of Mecca. Hejaz Railway stations in Saudi Arabia were:

See also 

 Transport in Saudi Arabia
 Saudi Railway Company
 Saudi Railways Organization

References

External links 
 Hejaz Railway
 UNHCR Atlas Map

Railway stations
Railway stations
Saudi Arabia